Shanghai railway station (Shanghainese: Zånhae Hutsuzae) is one of the four major railway stations in Shanghai, China, the others being Shanghai South, Shanghai Hongqiao, and Shanghai West (Shanghaixi).

The station is located on Moling Road, Jing'an District, to the North of the city centre. It is governed by Shanghai Railway Bureau and is one of the most important hubs of the railway network in China.

History and development 
Shanghai station is called "the new railway station" by locals since it replaced Shanghai North railway station (also known as "Old North railway station", or "Old North Station" - 老北站 by locals) as the city's main train station in 1987. In the late '80s, the old North railway station was inadequate to handle the increasing railway traffic in Shanghai. The government then decided to pull down the Shanghai East (freight) railway station and build a new railway station at the same place. On 28 December 1987, the North railway station was closed. At the same time, the new Shanghai railway station was built and started its operation.

In 2006, some railway lines of the station were moved to the reopened Shanghai South railway station, which lessened the increasing pressure of passenger traffic. In August 2006, a decision was made to renovate the aging station and its surrounding area. Many new ticket machines were installed to increase efficiency.

In June 2008, in order to co-operate with the opening of World Expo Shanghai 2010, Shanghai Government and Zhabei District carried out a new renovation called the "Shanghai Railway Station North Plaza Comprehensive Transportation Hub Project" with a total investment over 4.1 billion RMB.

On May 29, 2010, the renovation was completed. It expanded the north building from 1,000 square meters to 15,560 square meters, refurbished the south building and added a new designed wave-shaped roof over the platform.

In late 2015, rumours of the demolition of the Shanghai railway station arose. Many locals had believed this because of the many residential developments and needlessness of the station as there are already the Shanghai Hongqiao, Shanghai South, and Shanghai West stations. However, this rumour has been rejected by the Shanghai Municipal Government.

Connections
Most long-haul, non high-speed trains bound for Jiangsu Province, Anhui Province and the North (i.e. destinations north of the Yangzhe River) depart from Shanghai railway station. It also offers regional high-speed CRH trains to Nanjing and Hefei as well as overnight high-speed trains to Beijing and Xi’an.

It offers
 T trains (special fast trains that only stop at main stations) to Dalian, Beijing, Ürümqi, Nanjing, Yangzhou, Hangzhou, Xian, Lanzhou, Jinan, Tongling, Tianjin, Taizhou and Ningbo in mainland China, as well as across the border to Kowloon in Hong Kong.
 K trains (fast) to Anyang, Guiyang, Changsha, Guangzhou, Kunming, Wuhan, Yinchuan, Xining, Nanchang, Zhanjiang, Fuzhou, Xiamen, Yichang, Chongqing, Fuyang, Shenyang, Shijiazhuang, Baotou, Qingdao, Tianjin, Taiyuan, Harbin, and Jilin.
In addition, a lot of pass-by trains from the north to the south of China also use Shanghai station as an intermediate stop.

Transportation
Shanghai station can be reached by taking Shanghai Metro Line 1, 3 or 4. Due to its pervasive connections with the Shanghai street network, the station is also accessible by numerous bus lines and by taxi. Taxis are not allowed to stop directly in front of the station, but at an underground taxi stop.

Gallery

See also

Shanghai Hongqiao railway station
Shanghai South railway station
Shanghai West railway station
Rapid transit in the People's Republic of China

References

External links

Shanghai Train Guide - Timetables, tips, routes, and schedules

Railway stations in Shanghai
Stations on the Beijing–Shanghai Railway
Stations on the Shanghai–Kunming Railway
Stations on the Shanghai–Nanjing Intercity Railway
China–Hong Kong border crossings
Jing'an District